Donald Frizell Hyde (17 April 1909 – 5 February 1966) was president of the Grolier Club and the Bibliographical Society of America, a trustee of the New York Public Library and the Pierpont Morgan Library, and a member of the advisory committees of Harvard and Yale libraries.

References 

1909 births
1966 deaths
People from Chillicothe, Ohio
Harvard University alumni
20th-century American lawyers
American bibliophiles